Clarrie Hall Dam is a minor ungated concrete faced rockfill embankment dam with an uncontrolled concrete-lined chute spillway across the Doon Doon Creek, located upstream of the small town of Uki, in the Northern Rivers region of New South Wales, Australia. The main purpose of the dam is for water supply and it creates the artificial Lake Clarrie Hall.

Location and features
Clarrie Hall dam construction commenced in 1979 and it was opened in 1983 with the unique distinction of being full after heavy rainfall prior to the opening ceremony. The primary function of the dam is to provide storage of water for Tweed Shire's drinking water supply, by releasing water downstream into Doon Doon Creek when levels of freshwater in the Tweed River fall below 95%, which occurs mostly in winter and spring. Otherwise the natural flows of the Tweed River provide 80% of the water needs of the Shire.

The uncontrolled chute spillway is capable of discharging . The estimated completion cost was A$34 million.

It is expected that the upgrade will be completed during 2014.

Following heavy rainfall in the catchment area, in January 2012 the dam was at its highest level since records commenced in 1986.

Recreation
Lake Clarrie Hall provides valuable public recreation including swimming, sailing, boating and freshwater fishing, including sports fishing for Australian bass. Boat access for electric outboard and paddle-powered craft is available at Crams Farm, at the southern end of the waterbody. Lake Clarrie Hall has been stocked with more than  Australian bass fingerlings over the past 10 years. A fishing licence is required to fish in the lake.

High levels of blue-green algae are common on the lake surface.

Proposed raising of the dam wall
In December 2015, Approval was given by Tweed Shire Council to raise the dam wall by 8.5 metres, doubling its footprint and trebling its capacity. An environmental impact assessment is due to be completed in February 2021, and construction is not expected to begin until December 2023. 12 of 16 properties or part properties had already been purchased for the purpose of the project as of December 2020.

Ecological impact 
According to the council's Flora and Fauna Survey and Preliminary Environmental Impact Assessment, 119.66 of the 223.10 hectares due to be inundated is dominated by native vegetation. Rainforest of high conservation value and nine threatened plant species (of which two prefer the area to be inundated) were found in the area to be affected.

Just under half of the native bushland to be inundated is designated key fauna habitat. 25 threatened animal species were discovered and seven of them depend on the tree hollows which were also found in the area due to be inundated.

Cultural heritage and inundation of archaeological sites 
Raising the dam wall could affect 81 sites – including campsites, rock shelters, stone artifacts, knapping resources, grinding grooves sites and a possible Aboriginal scarred tree – identified in an Archaeological Assessment and Aboriginal Cultural Heritage Assessment conducted for the council.

See also

 List of reservoirs and dams in Australia
 Uki, New South Wales
Environmental impact of reservoirs
Integrated water resources management
Mount Jerusalem National Park
Tweed River (New South Wales)

References

External links
 
 

Dams completed in 1982
Dams in New South Wales
Embankment dams
1982 establishments in Australia
Northern Rivers
Tweed Shire